Obsession is the fourth album of Blue System. Was published in 1990 by BMG Ariola and produced by Dieter Bohlen. The album contains 10 new tracks.

Track listing 
   "Love Is Such a Lonely Sword" (feat. Audrey Motaung) – 4:10
   "When Sarah Smiles" – 3:41
   "Behind the Silence"  –  3:32
   "2000 Miles" – 3:46
   "Two Hearts Beat as One" – 3:48
   "48 Hours" – 3:54
   "I'm Not That Kind of Guy" – 3:27
   "Try the Impossible" – 3:24
   "Another Lonely Night" – 3:09
   "I'm the Pilot of Your Love"  –  3:21

Personnel
 Dieter Bohlen –  lead vocals, producer, arranger, lyrics
 Rolf Köhler – refrain vocals, chorus falsetto
 Detlef Wiedeke – chorus falsetto
 Michael Scholz – chorus falsetto
 Luis Rodríguez – co-producer, engineering

Charts

External links

Blue System albums
1990 albums
Bertelsmann Music Group albums